Kwangmyŏng station is a railway station in Kwangmyŏng-ri, Kosan county, Kangwŏn province, North Korea, on the Kangwŏn Line of the Korean State Railway.

Originally called Sŏgwangsa station (Chosŏn'gŭl: 석왕사역; Hanja: 釋王寺驛), the station, along with the rest of the former Kyŏngwŏn Line, was opened by the Japanese on 16 August 1914. It was given its current name after the establishment of the DPRK.

References

Railway stations in North Korea